Spellbondage was the fourth full-length LP by Sleep Chamber. The lineup on this recording was John Zewizz, Jacqueline Briley, Jonathan Briley, and Lawrence Van Horn. The recording was produced by Paul Arnold at Newbury Sound in Boston.

The album cover features Debbie Jaffe of Master Slave Relationship.

The album was pressed in the US by Inner-X-Musick on cassette (without a catalog number), and vinyl LP (catalog XXX-LP-09).

Track listing
Side One:
 Site ov Pain / Site ov Pleasure
 Odoratus Sexualis
 Kiss the Whip
 The Nun (Fetish Convent)
Side Two:
 Extreme Unktion
 Femme Fatale
 Vortex
 Thee Unforgiven

References
http://www.discogs.com/Sleep-Chamber-Spellbondage/master/27175
http://www.freewebs.com/theebradmiller/spellbondage.htm

1987 albums